The  bell trumpet jelly (Lipkea stephensoni), is a species of stalked jellyfish in the family Lipkeidae.

Description
This small stalked jellyfish grows up to 1 cm across and is pale and transparent. Four distinct opaque white lines run down the bell and into the mouth, which is surrounded by four horseshoe-shaped gonads. The bell has opaque white spots. Several lobes extend from the margin of the bell.

Distribution
This stalked jellyfish has been found in Smitswinkel Bay off Cape Town in less than 10m of water.

References

Lipkeidae
Animals described in 1933